

The THK 11 was a 1940s prototype Turkish four-seat monoplane, designed by Stanisław Rogalski and built by  (THK - Turkish Aeronautical Association).

Design and development
The THK-11 was a high-wing twin-boom cantilever cabin monoplane with a  de Havilland Gipsy Major piston engine driving a pusher propeller. It has a fixed nose-wheel landing gear and was first flown in 1947.

Specifications

See also

References

1940s Turkish civil utility aircraft
Single-engined pusher aircraft
Turkish Aeronautical Association aircraft
High-wing aircraft
Aircraft first flown in 1947
Twin-boom aircraft